Mohsen Bengar (born 6 July 1979 in Nowshahr) is a retired Iranian football defender and current coach.

Club career

Early career
He began his career in Shamoushak Noshahr, then moved to Sepahan in 2004 and won two Hazfi Cup titles, also playing in the AFC Champions League and FIFA Club World Cup for Sepahan. He could not play as many matches as before in the 2008–09 season due to injuries, but in the next season he was a regular player in the defence despite the signing of Jalal Hosseini. He won the league with Sepahan three times in a row in 2010, 2011 and 2012. He announced that he would leave the team after eight years at the end of the 2011–12 season.

Persepolis

He signed a two-year contract with Tehran's reds until the end of the 2013–14 Season. On 24 May 2014, he extended his contract with Persepolis for two years, keeping him in the team till 2016. Bengar scored his first goal for Persepolis on 5 September 2014 in a 3–1 loss to Tractor. He also scored Persepolis' first goal in the 2015 AFC Champions League on 24 February 2015 in a 3–0 win against Lekhwiya.

Club career statistics

 Assist Goals

International career
He was invited to Team Melli for some matches but he did not play that much; finally after good games for Sepahan in different competitions he found some place for himself and started the game against Kuwait in 2010 FIFA World Cup Qualifying. He won the West Asian Football Federation Championship 2008 with Team Melli. He played a match against UAE in 2011 Asian Cup.

Honours

Club
Sepahan
Iran Pro League (3): 2009–10, 2010–11, 2011–12, runner-up 2007–08
Hazfi Cup (2): 2005–06, 2006–07
AFC Champions League runner-up: 2007

Persepolis
Iran Pro League runner-up: 2013–14, 2015–16
Hazfi Cup runner-up: 2012–13

Country
Iran
WAFF Championship (1): 2008

References

External links 
Mohsen Bengar at PersianLeague.com

1979 births
Living people
Iranian footballers
Persepolis F.C. players
Sepahan S.C. footballers
Iran international footballers
Shamoushak Noshahr players
2011 AFC Asian Cup players
Sportspeople from Mazandaran province
Association football central defenders
Tractor S.C. players
Persian Gulf Pro League players
People from Nowshahr